List of people from Washington may refer to:

 List of people from Washington (state)
 List of people from Washington, D.C.